Schmidtea mediterranea is a freshwater triclad that lives in southern Europe and Tunisia. It is a model for regeneration, stem cells and development of tissues such as the brain and germline.

Distribution
Schmidtea mediterranea is found in some coastal areas and islands in the western Mediterranean (Catalonia, Menorca, Mallorca, Corsica, Sardinia, Sicily and Tunisia).

Ecology
High water temperatures of 25–27 °C have deleterious effects on populations of S. mediterranea, while this species tolerates variations in the acidity of the water (pH 6.9–8.9) without a noticeable influence on their survival.

S. mediterranea can be found with associated fauna such as gastropods, bivalves, insects, leeches, and nematodes.

Reproduction
The sexual specimens of Schmidtea mediterranea produce cocoons between November and April. In May, when water temperature rises above 20 °C, they lose their reproductive apparatus. Despite this, they don't reproduce asexually (by fissiparity) during the summer months.

Research 
Almost any piece from a Schmidtea mediterranea individual can regenerate an entire organism in a few days. This is in part enabled by the presence of abundant pluripotent stem cells called neoblasts. Transplantation of a single neoblast to a fatally injured animal has been shown to rescue the animal

An analysis of the genome of S. mediterranea indicated the presence of a previously unknown family of long terminal repeats and the lack of several essential genes, including genes responsible for the synthesis of fatty acids and the MAD1 and MAD2 genes, which were thought to be essential components of the spindle assembly checkpoint.

References

External links
 Schmidtea mediterranea, model planarian facts, life cycle, anatomy at GeoChemBio

Dugesiidae
Animal models
Animals described in 1975